Dayne Donoghue is an English former professional rugby league footballer who played in the 2000s and 2010s most notable for his time spent at the Widnes Vikings, and the Rochdale Hornets.

References

1988 births
Living people
English rugby league players
Rochdale Hornets players
Rugby league locks
Rugby league players from Widnes
Rugby league second-rows
Widnes Vikings players